Lambrigg is a civil parish in the South Lakeland district of the English county of Cumbria.  It includes the hamlets of Cross Houses and Lambrigg Head, and the hill of Lambrigg Fell.  The parish has a population of 90. As the population taken at the 2011 Census was less than 100, data was included with the parish of Docker.

See also

Listed buildings in Lambrigg

References

External links
 Cumbria County History Trust: Lambrigg (nb: provisional research only – see Talk page)

Civil parishes in Cumbria